Eric Norman Webb  (1889–1984) was an engineer known for his role as chief magnetician on the Australasian Antarctic Expedition.

Biography
Eric Norman Webb was born in Christchurch, New Zealand in 1889. He studied civil engineering at the University of Canterbury and worked at the Melbourne Observatory carrying out observations for the Carnegie Institution for Science.

At age 22 he was selected as chief magnetician on Sir Douglas Mawson's Australasian Antarctic Expedition. Part of his role while based at Cape Denison was to take daily measurements from the Magnetograph House, which he carried out daily regardless of the sometimes difficult conditions. He took part in a sledging journey with Edward Frederick Robert Bage and Frank Hurley to the South Magnetic Pole, a round trip of 960km. Both Cape Webb and Webb Subglacial Trench are named after him.

Webb served in the British Army during World War I. He enlisted in the 7th Field Company Engineers and embarked from Sydney on 30 November 2015 on board HMAT A23 Suffolk. He received the Military Cross, Distinguished Service Order, 1914–15 Star, British War Medal and Victory Medal, and was mentioned in despatches. 

He later worked in hydroelectric projects including the Churchill Falls Generating Station (then known as Hamilton Falls) in Labrador, Canada. He visited Australia in 1974 and was interviewed for ABC Television about his role in the Australasian Antarctic Expedition.

Eric Webb was the last surviving member of the Australasian Antarctic Expedition. He died on 23 January 1984.

References

External links
 Eric Norman Webb 'Sledging Diary', 10 November 1912-11 January 1913
 Eric Webb interviewed by Lennard Bickel (sound recording, available online)

1889 births
1984 deaths
Military personnel from Christchurch
British Army personnel of World War I
Royal Engineers officers
Australasian Antarctic Expedition
Australian Companions of the Distinguished Service Order
Australian recipients of the Military Cross
Magneticians
University of Canterbury alumni
Australian civil engineers